Karl Brunner (born 19 May 1951 in Olang) was an Italian luger who competed from the early 1970s to the mid-1980s. He won the silver medal in the men's doubles event at the 1980 Winter Olympics in Lake Placid, New York.

Brunner also won three medals at the FIL World Luge Championships with two medals in men's singles (gold: 1971, silver: 1979) and one in men's doubles (silver: 1977). He also won three medals at the FIL European Luge Championships with a gold (Men's singles: 1980) and two bronzes (Men's singles: 1977, Men's doubles: 1979).

Brunner also won the overall Luge World Cup men's doubles title three times (1977-8, 1978-9, 1982-3) and had his best overall men's single World Cup finish of second in 1979-80.

References

External links

 

1951 births
Italian male lugers
Living people
Lugers at the 1972 Winter Olympics
Lugers at the 1976 Winter Olympics
Lugers at the 1980 Winter Olympics
Olympic lugers of Italy
Olympic medalists in luge
Medalists at the 1980 Winter Olympics
Olympic silver medalists for Italy
People from Olang
Lugers of Centro Sportivo Carabinieri
Sportspeople from Südtirol